The Hastings Formation is a geological formation in Nova Scotia, Canada whose strata date back to the Early Carboniferous/Mississippian (late Viséan to early Serpukhovian).

See also

References

Geology of Nova Scotia